Didi's Dream (also known as Didi's Dreams) is a 2017 Taiwanese-Chinese comedy film written and directed by Kevin Tsai. The film stars Dee Hsu, Lin Chi-ling, Jin Shijia and Li Zifeng.

Premise
When Didi, an aspiring actress who lives in the shadow of her superstar older sister, meets Xu Chunmei, the heartbroken owner of a space station noodle shop, twists and turns in their crossed paths take them on a crazy adventure that fate has planned out for them.

Cast

Dee Hsu as Shangguan Didi / Xu Chunmei
Jin Shijia as Kouzi
David Chao as Television commercial director
William Shen as Infomercial producer
Vincent Liang as Producer
Bruce Chen as Job interviewer
Junior Han as Film director
Gigi Lin as Job interviewer
Vila Fan as Film producer
Chen Han-dian as Wang Diandian
Tender Huang as Fang
Riva Chang as Tian Mei
Michael Yang as Job interviewer
Evonne Hsieh as Hsiao-hold
Sky Li
Luke Wu

Guest appearance
Lin Chi-ling as Shangguan Lingling

Special appearance
Li Zifeng as Astronaut #49

Soundtrack

Featured songs

References

External links
 
 
 
 
 

2017 films
Taiwanese fantasy comedy films
2010s Mandarin-language films
Chinese fantasy comedy films
2010s fantasy comedy films
Films about actors
Films about comedians
Le Vision Pictures films
2017 directorial debut films
2017 comedy films